Hypoleschus is a genus of true weevils in the beetle family Curculionidae. There is one described species in Hypoleschus, H. atratus.

References

Further reading

 
 
 

Curculioninae
Articles created by Qbugbot